Tambovka is a rural locality (a selo) and the administrative center of Tambovskoye Rural Settlement, Ternovsky District, Voronezh Oblast, Russia. The population was 319 as of 2010. There are 8 streets.

Geography 
Tambovka is located 43 km west of Ternovka (the district's administrative centre) by road. Alexandrovka is the nearest rural locality.

References 

Rural localities in Ternovsky District